Héctor Lizárraga (born September 1, 1966) is a Mexican former professional boxer who competed from 1985 to 2003. He held the IBF featherweight title from 1997 to 1998.

Professional career
In April 1989 Hector won the WBC Continental Americas featherweight title by beating veteran Hugo Anguiano.

IBF featherweight title
On December 13, 1997 Lizarraga won the IBF featherweight title by defeating South Africa's Welcome Ncita.

Personal life
He was married to Teresa and has four kids: Hector Jr, Esteban, Jesenia, and Eddie.

See also
List of Mexican boxing world champions
List of IBF world champions
List of world featherweight boxing champions

References

External links

Mexican male boxers
World boxing champions
International Boxing Federation champions
World featherweight boxing champions
Featherweight boxers
1966 births
Living people